Edward Cox may refer to:

Edward E. Cox (1880–1952), United States Representative from Georgia
Edward Everett Cox (1867–1931), Publisher from Indiana
Edward F. Cox (born 1946), American lawyer, son-in-law of Richard M. Nixon
Edward G. Cox (1876–1963), American linguist and yachtsman
Edward King Cox (1829–1883), Australian politician
Edward William Cox (1809–1879), British MP for Taunton, 1868–1869
Edward Cox (Australian politician) (died 1868), English-born Australian politician
Edward Cox (canoeist) (born 1985), British sprint canoeist
Ed Cox (poet) (1946–1992), American poet
Ed Cox (artist), American role-playing game artist
Sir Owen Cox (Edward Owen Cox, 1866–1932), Welsh-born Australian businessman and politician

See also
Ted Cox (disambiguation)
Edward Charles Cocks (1786–1812), British Army officer and politician
Edward Cock (1805–1892), British surgeon
Edwin L. Cox, American oilman and philanthropist